The Parliamentary Bribery Commission (known as the  Thalagodapitiya Commission ) was a commission of inquiry appointed by Governor General of Ceylon Sir Oliver Goonetilleke by warrant dated 11 September 1959 to investigate and inquire into allegations of bribery and corruption among the ruling party members of parliament. 

The Commission consisted of Walter Thalgodapitiya, District Judge as chairmen; Thomas Webb Roberts, retired officer of the Ceylon Civil Service and Samuel John Charles Schokman, Advocate and former Crown Counsel. Appointed days before the Bandaranaike assassination, the commission tabled its report, titled The Reports of the Parliamentary Bribery Commission, 1959-1960 in the House of Representatives of Ceylon on 16 December 1960 and was published on 22 December 1960. 

The report found evidence of bribery against two former ministers C. A. S. Marikkar and M. P. de Zoysa, as well as parliamentarians D. B. Monnekulame, H. Abeywickrema, M. S. Kariapper and R. E. Jayatillake. Monnekulame and Kariapper resigned soon after the publication of the report. The Sirima Bandaranaike government at the time did not take any action based on the report. In 1965, the new national government, led by the UNP revisited the report and enacted the Imposition Of Civic Disabilities (Special Provisions) Act (No. 14 of 1965) which stripped Marikkar, de Zoysa, Abeywickrema, Kariapper, Jayatilleke, and Monnekulame of their civic rights for a period of seven years and Kariapper who was a member of parliament at the time lost his seat.

See also
 Commission to Enquire into Bribery in the State Council of Ceylon 
 Lessons Learnt and Reconciliation Commission

External list 
 Commission To Investigate Allegations Of Bribery Or Corruption
 Examining Facets of Corruption in Sri Lanka

References

Sri Lankan commissions and inquiries
Government reports
Bribery scandals
1959 in Ceylon
1960 documents